Adversary in the House (1947) is a biographical novel based on the life of prominent socialist Eugene V. Debs and of his wife Kate, who was opposed to socialism.

The book is Irving Stone's portrayal of Eugene V. Debs's "tempestuous relationship with a wife who rejects the very values he holds most dear".

Footnotes

1947 American novels
Biographical novels
Novels by Irving Stone
Novels set in the 19th century
Doubleday (publisher) books
Eugene V. Debs